The Howard Bison women's basketball team represents Howard University in women's basketball. The school competes in the Mid-Eastern Athletic Conference in Division I of the National Collegiate Athletic Association (NCAA). The Bison play their home games at Burr Gymnasium in Washington, D.C.

History
Howard has won the MEAC Tournament ten times (but none since 2001), but they have only competed in five NCAA Tournaments due to the MEAC champion not going to the Tournament from 1983 to 1994. Sanya Tyler was the coach for all but one of the Bison's tournament championships in her tenure, beginning in 1980. In the 1982 Tournament, they lost to Long Beach 95-57 in the First Round. In the 1996 Tournament, they lost 94-63 to Connecticut in the First Round. In 1997, they lost 111-59 to Stanford in the First Round. In 1998, they lost 91-71 to North Carolina in the First Round. In 2001 (their last Tournament to date), they lost 100-61 to Iowa State. They have appeared in the WNIT twice (2012 and 2013). In the former, they lost 59-56 to Virginia. In the latter, they lost to Penn 65-60, both times being in the First Round.

NCAA tournament results
The Bison have appeared in six NCAA Tournaments, with a combined record of 1–6.

References

External links